Zhu Xuejun (born December 1962) is a Chinese missile scientist. She is a member of the Communist Party of China.

Education
Zhu was born in Shenyang, Liaoning in December 1962. She graduated from No.1 Research Institute of the Ministry of Space Industry.

Career
After graduation, she worked there. She was a delegate to the 11th and 12th National People's Congress. She is a member of the 13th National Committee of the Chinese People's Political Consultative Conference.

Contribution
She was the chief designer of the DF-17, a solid-fuelled road-mobile Short-range ballistic missile that mounts the DF-ZF Hypersonic Glide Vehicle.

Honours and awards
 November 22, 2019 Member of the Chinese Academy of Sciences (CAS)

References

1962 births
Living people
Politicians from Shenyang
Scientists from Liaoning
Delegates to the 11th National People's Congress
Delegates to the 12th National People's Congress
Members of the Chinese Academy of Sciences
Chinese Communist Party politicians from Liaoning
People's Republic of China politicians from Liaoning